Philautus jacobsoni is a species of frog in the family Rhacophoridae.
It is endemic to Java, Indonesia. It is known only from Mount Ungaran, Central Java, Indonesia. There is only one preserved specimen held at the Naturalis Biodiversity Center in Leiden, Netherlands that was collected in the 1930s. Its status in the wild is currently unknown and could possibly be extinct, as it has not been recently found.

Its natural habitats are subtropical or tropical moist lowland forests and subtropical or tropical moist montane forests.
It is threatened by habitat loss.

References

jacobsoni
Amphibians of Indonesia
Endemic fauna of Java
Taxa named by Pieter Nicolaas van Kampen
Amphibians described in 1912
Taxonomy articles created by Polbot